The Heckler & Koch G36 (Gewehr 36) is a 5.56×45mm assault rifle designed in the early 1990s by German weapons manufacturer Heckler & Koch as a replacement for the heavier 7.62×51mm G3 battle rifle. It was accepted into service with the Bundeswehr in 1997, replacing the G3. Since then, it has also been a popular export, and the G36 has seen active service in military and police units in several countries, including Germany, Spain, and the United Kingdom. The G36 is gas-operated and feeds from a 30-round detachable box magazine or 100-round C-Mag drum magazine.

In 2012, the G36 was found to suffer from severe accuracy problems when the weapon overheated which prompted the search for a replacement. In 2017, the Bundeswehr launched the System Sturmgewehr Bundeswehr, a program to find a replacement for the G36. The weapons put forth were the Heckler & Koch HK416, Heckler & Koch HK433, and the Haenel MK 556. The HK416A8 was selected as the winner in 2022 to become the new service rifle.

History

Development
Work on a successor for the venerable G3 rifle had been ongoing in Germany since the second half of the 1970s. These efforts resulted in the innovative 4.73mm G11 assault rifle (developed jointly by a group of companies led by H&K), that used caseless ammunition (designed by the Dynamit Nobel company). It had been predicted that this weapon would eventually replace the G3, therefore further development of H&K's series of firearms chambered for the 5.56×45mm NATO cartridge had been halted. Heckler & Koch, having no incentive to pursue a new 5.56 mm weapon system, was content with the export-oriented HK33 and G41 rifles. However, the G11 program came to an abrupt end when the Bundeswehr cancelled its procurement due to defence budget cuts after the unification of East and West Germany and H&K was acquired in 1991 by British Aerospace's Royal Ordnance division (known today as BAE Systems).

Increasing interest in Germany for a modern service rifle chambered for the NATO-standard 5.56 mm cartridge led H&K to offer the German armed forces the G41 rifle, which, too, was rejected. Design work was then initiated from the ground up on a modern 5.56 mm assault rifle designated "Project 50" or HK50. The prototype was then trialled, where it was rated higher than the rival Austrian Steyr AUG system. The final version of the G36 was completed in 1995. Production of the G36 began in 1996.

Production
The HK50 rifle was selected for service and an initial order was placed for 33,000 rifles under the Bundeswehr designation Gewehr G36. The order also involved an option for a further 17,000 rifles. Deliveries were first made to the Bundeswehrs NATO Quick Reaction Force during the fourth quarter of 1997. The G36's production line began in early 1996.

In July 1998, it was announced that the G36 had been selected as the standard rifle for the Spanish Armed Forces, replacing the 5.56 mm CETME Model L and LC rifles. Deliveries first took place at the end of 1999. From 1999 to 2005, 75,219 of these rifles were manufactured in Spain under license by General Dynamics Santa Bárbara Sistemas at the FACOR (Fábrica de Armas de la Coruña) facility, in Coruña, Galicia.

In addition, the rifle has been licensed for local production in Saudi Arabia. The manufacturer in the country is the Military Industries Corporation. Technology transfer was granted by Germany to Saudi Arabia on 30 June 2008 The first Saudi-made G36 was produced at MIC's factory on 30 June 2009. However, some components of their own G36s are supplied by Heckler & Koch.

 Replacement 
In April 2012, reports surfaced that G36 rifles used in Afghanistan would overheat during prolonged firefights after several hundred rounds were fired. Overheating affected the accuracy of the G36, making it difficult to hit targets past 100 meters, ineffective past 200 meters, and incapable of effective fire past 300 meters. The G36 has been called unsuitable for long battles. Operational commanders advised allowing the weapon to cool between periods of rapid shooting.Deutsches Sturmgewehr für langen Kampf untauglich - Welt.de, 25 April 2012

In February 2014, the German Federal Ministry of Defence announced that the overheating deficiencies of the G36 were not a result of weapon design, but of the ammunition. A report by the Bundeswehr on 21 February 2014, revealed that the issues were not the fault of the rifle, but that one manufacturer of ammunition was making bullets with copper-plated jackets that were too thin.HECKLER & KOCH G36 Wärmeproblematik geklärt  Magazines CALIBER 4/14 and VISIER The manufacturer of the ammunition confirmed this, although experts disagreed, and also said the accuracy problems were already known to the defence ministry by 2010. 

On 22 June 2014, it was reported that Germany's defense ministry had temporarily halted new orders worth €34 million ($ million) over accuracy concerns for the rifle. The Bundeswehr consulted the Fraunhofer Institute for High-Speed Dynamics (Ernst Mach Institut) and the Federal Criminal Police Office. On 30 March 2015, Minister of Defence Ursula von der Leyen told the Associated Press that the weight-saving design was the root of the issues. This is based on a letter from Inspector General Volker Wieker advising the Stewards of Defence and Budget Committee of the Bundestag and the troops in advance of publication of the report. The report was released by the Fraunhofer Ernst Mach Institut and Wehrtechnische Dienststelle 91 on 19 April 2015.

On 22 April 2015, von der Leyen, announced that the G36 would be phased out of the German army due to these concerns and claimed that "The Heckler & Koch G36 has no future in the German army in its current state of construction."

In 2016, the Ministry of Defence attempted to sue Heckler & Koch, saying they were legally obligated to repair the subpar G36 rifles. Because the Bundeswehr did not make its specifications for the weapon clear enough in the beginning of the procurement process, the District Court of Koblenz rejected claims from the Bundeswehr procurement office, and ruled that weapon manufacturer Heckler & Koch did not have to pay damages on the 167,000 rifles still in use out of more than 176,000 G36 rifles Germany had originally purchased.

The Bundeswehr began the System Sturmgewehr Bundeswehr (Bundeswehr Assault Rifle System) effort to replace the G36 in 2017. Initially, C.G. Haenel won the competition in September 2020 offering their Haenel MK 556. However, German authorities canceled the contract the next month amid allegations that the MK 556 infringed on Heckler and Koch patents, and the HK416A8 was selected in spring 2021. Haenel sued to attempt to reverse the decision, but a German court dismissed the lawsuit in June 2022. In December 2022, the Bundestag approved initial funding to begin procuring the HK416A8. The Bundeswehr expects to purchase 118,718 rifles, designated G95A1 with a  barrel and G95KA1 with a  barrel. Fielding is planned to start in 2024.Meet the G95A1 & G95KA1 – the German Army’s New Rifles. The Firearm Blog. 20 December 2022.

Design details
The G36 is a selective-fire 5.56 mm assault rifle, firing from a closed rotary bolt. The G36 has a conventional layout and a modular component design. Common to all variants of the G36 family are: the receiver and buttstock assembly, bolt carrier group with bolt and the return mechanism and guide rod. The receiver contains the barrel, carry handle with integrated sights, trigger group with pistol grip, handguard and magazine socket.

The G36 employs a free-floating barrel (the barrel does not contact the handguard). The barrel is fastened to the receiver with a special nut, which can be removed with a wrench. The barrel is produced using a cold hammer forging process and features a chrome-lined bore with 6 right-hand grooves and a 1 in 178 mm (1:7 in) rifling twist rate. The barrel assembly consists of the gas block, a collar with a bayonet lug that is also used to launch rifle grenades and a slotted flash suppressor.

The weapon can be stripped and re-assembled without tools through a system of cross-pins similar to that used on earlier HK designs. For cleaning purposes, the G36 dismantles into the following groups: receiver housing, return mechanism, bolt carrier group and trigger group.

Features
Fire selector 
The fire and safety selector is ambidextrous and has controls on both sides of the receiver which are taken from the design of the original G3 selector. Selector settings are described with letters: "S"—safe ("Sicher"), "E"—semi-automatic fire ("Einzelfeuer") and "F"—automatic fire ("Feuerstoß"). The three position fire selector has a 0°/45°/90° rotation pattern between the settings. HK also offers several other trigger options, including the so-called Navy trigger group, with settings analogous to the standard trigger, but the selector positions have been illustrated with pictograms. A semi-automatic only trigger unit (lacks the "F" setting) is also available.

Magazine
By default, the G36 uses a 30-round magazine. The magazines are molded with shock resistant plastic, and are translucent, allowing the user to see how much is in the magazine at any given time. The sides have studs which allow the magazines to be attached next to each other, allowing the operator to reload more easily. An empty G36 magazine weighs  and  when fully loaded. For comparison, a loaded STANAG magazine weighs 450 grams (15.9 oz). STANAG magazines cannot be normally used, but the G36 can use an adapter that will accept them. Certain types of Beta C-Mags, which hold 100 rounds, can also be used and are employed with the MG36 variant.

Stock
The stock has the ability to fold to one side, shortening the overall length of the weapon for use in tight areas or vehicles. The rifle can also still fire with the stock collapsed. Also, it incorporates holes where assembly pins can be placed during weapon cleaning and maintenance.

Material
The G36 employs a large number of lightweight, corrosion-resistant synthetic materials in its design; the receiver housing, stock, trigger group (including the fire control selector and firing mechanism parts), magazine well, handguard and carry handle are all made of a carbon fiber-reinforced polyamide. The receiver has an integrated steel barrel trunnion (with locking recesses) and a nylon 66 steel reinforced receiver.

Sights

The standard German Army versions of the G36 are equipped with a ZF 3×4° dual optical sight that combines a 3× magnified telescopic sight (with the main reticle designed for firing at 200 m and bullet drop compensation markings for: 200, 400, 600 and 800 m crosshairs and a range-finding scale) and an unmagnified reflex sight (calibrated for firing at 100 m) mounted on top of the telescopic sight. The reflex sight is illuminated by ambient light during the day and uses battery powered illumination for use at night. Electric illumination is activated automatically by a built in photo sensor and can be manually activated to boost the brightness of the reticle in daytime low contrast situations.

The export versions have a single telescopic sight with a 1.5× magnification and an aiming reticle fixed at 300 m. All rifles are adapted to use the Hensoldt NSA 80 third-generation night sight, which clamps into the G36 carry handle adapter in front of the optical sight housing and mates with the rifle's standard optical sight. The sighting bridge also functions as a carrying handle and features auxiliary open sights molded on top of the handle that consist of a forward blade and rear notch, but these can only be used with the reflex sight removed, as in the G36V. The optical sight system is produced by Hensoldt AG (a subsidiary of Carl Zeiss AG).

Operating mechanism
The G36 uses a short-stroke piston system from which HK later developed the HK-416's impingement system. Unlike direct impingement, this system takes gas trailing the bullet to operate a piston instead of pushing directly on the bolt. The G36's bolt is operated by a cam that guides the bolt carrier by its respective cutout. Then when fully pushed forward 7 radial locking lugs fully enclose the chamber.

HK included several design features that are essential in modern military firearms. For example, the bolt locks back after the last round is spent (this can be deactivated), and at the front end of the trigger guard there is a bolt catch button. The cocking handle can be switched from either end, folds in, and unfolds from a spring so the shooter need not unfold it by hand before firing. Another feature of it is that it doubles as the forward assist, which is used in the instance that the spent cartridge is ejected but the next round does not properly feed. In addition, the ejection port has a brass deflector to mitigate the amount of casings that may strike the face of left-handed operators. Instead of a dust cover which has the need to be flipped back up when the gun isn't in use, the bolt acts as the seal from dirt.

Accessories
The rifle can be fitted with a 40 mm AG36 (AG—Anbau-Granatwerfer) under-barrel grenade launcher, which is a breech-loaded break-action weapon with a side-tilting barrel.

Standard equipment supplied with the G36 includes: spare magazines, a cleaning and maintenance kit, sling, speed-loading device and sometimes modified AKM type II blade bayonets (many of which are left over in Germany from stocks of the former National People's Army).

Variants

 G36C (C="Compact"): This subcarbine model is a further development of the G36K. It has a shorter barrel than the G36K, and a four-prong open-type flash hider or a birdcage type flash hider. The extremely short barrel forced designers to move the gas block closer to the muzzle end and reduce the length of the gas piston operating rod. The handguard and stock were also shortened and the fixed carry handle (with optics) was replaced with a carrying handle with an integrated MIL-STD-1913 Picatinny rail. The dual optical sight found on the standard G36 and G36K models was replaced with a set of rail-mounted detachable iron sights that consist of a semi-shrouded front post and a flip-up rear sight with two apertures of different diameter. The short handguard has four accessory attachment points, one of which could be used for a vertical grip. The G36C was developed and produced in January 2001.G36K (K—kurz "short"): carbine variant with a shorter barrel (fitted with an open-type flash suppressor) and a shorter forend, which includes a bottom rail that can be used to attach tactical accessories, such as a UTL flashlight from the USP pistol. The carbine's barrel lacks the ability to launch rifle grenades and it will not support a bayonet. The weapon retained the ability to be used with the AG36 grenade launcher. G36Ks in service with German special forces are issued with a 100-round C-Mag drum. There are two variants of the G36K. The first and most commonly known has x3 scope/carry handle attached to the top, while the second is equipped with iron sights and a rail (no scope included).G36KA4: A variant that started showing up in 2016-2017 that improved on the G36K. It added the  proprietary HKey mod system to the handguard, to add more tactical accessories, a heavier barrel, and removed x3 scope on the carry handle, for a lower profile carry handle with an integrated MIL-STD-1913 Picatinny rail. The standard G36 stock was also replaced with an IdZ adjustable stock for better handling with use of body armor.G36KV (formerly G36KE): export version of carbine variant G36K, with sights like G36V.G36V (G36E) (V—Variante "variant"): Previously known as the G36E (E—Export), it is the export version of the standard G36. The G36V has all of the characteristics of the standard rifle with the exception of the sight setup and bayonet mount. It is fitted with a x1.5 or x3 sight and lacks the integrated reflector sight; the bayonet mount is a standard NATO type. This version was first produced for Spain and Latvia.G36A2: This is an ordnance designation allocated to an upgraded variant of the G36 used by the German Army. The G36A2 is equipped with a quick-detachable Zeiss RSA reflex red dot sight mounted on a Picatinny rail that replaces the original red dot sight of the dual combat sighting system. The G36A2 upgrade kit also consists of the shorter G36C stock (Designed for better handling with use of body armor and load bearing equipment), new handguard made of aluminium (provides better heat resistance during long periods of firing) with an optional four Picatinny rails and a vertical foregrip with an integrated switch for operating an Oerlikon Contraves LLM01 laser light module.
 MG36 (MG—Maschinengewehr "machine gun"): Squad automatic weapon version of the G36 equipped with a heavier barrel for increased heat and cook-off resistance. The MG36 and MG36E are no longer offered by H&K.

Sporting and civilian models
Based on the G36, Heckler & Koch also created the semi-automatic SL8 rifle and the straight-pull, bolt-action R8, which are offered to the civilian sport shooting markets. The SL8 is substantially different from the G36, it has a modified receiver and a thumbhole stock with a cheek rest, which is integral with the trigger group. The SL8 has a heavy profile, extended,  barrel that does not have a flash hider or bayonet lug. The rifle uses a 10-round single-stack magazine and an extended top rail used to mount a wide variety of Picatinny-standard optics. Mounted to the rail are a set of iron sights with a hooded foresight and adjustable flip rear aperture. The SL8 can also mount the G36 carry handle and integrated sight assembly, after removing the mechanical iron sights.

In November 2013, Heckler & Koch applied for permission from the German Government to sell a new civilian-legal version of the G36. Called the HK243 in Europe and the HK293''' in America, it is more similar to the G36 assault rifle than previous civilian models. The main difference is the bolt is redesigned to not allow a conversion to fully automatic fire. It has quad picatinny rails and accepts STANAG magazines.

In November 2020, semi-automatic only G36 rifles became available for sale on the civilian market in Canada. They were sold with match grade barrels by Lothar Walther for CAD $5,999, or with an H&K barrel for CAD $7,998.

Non-OEM upgrade
In May 2021, Steyr Arms introduced the G62 upgrade for G36 rifles. According to Steyr, the components of this upgrade kit (metal receiver, barrel and magazine well) can be mounted independently on existing G36 arms without any modifications. German media speculated this might be a relatively inexpensive way to extend the service life of the G36 in the Bundeswehr in wait for the outcome of legal procedures regarding a new system assault rifle tender for the Bundeswehr''.

Gallery

Users

See also

Similar rifles
 AN-94
 Beretta ARX-160
 FX-05 Xiuhcoatl
 XM8 rifle
 M27 IAR
 AK-12

References

Bibliography

External links

 
A2-222/0-0-4741 Zentralrichtlinie Das Gewehr G36 
 2008 Heckler & Koch Military and LE brochure
 REMTEK
G36KA4: Specialized Forces Assault Rifle (In German)
Heckler & Koch G36 in Mali

5.56×45mm NATO assault rifles
5.56 mm assault rifles
Short stroke piston firearms
Assault rifles
Police weapons
G36
Post–Cold War weapons of Germany
Modular firearms
Squad automatic weapons
Weapons and ammunition introduced in 1997